Pablo Granados (born September 13, 1965) is an Argentine actor, comedian and singer. Much of his work is in television, particularly for Canal 9 and América TV. He is well known for the 2004 series No hay 2 sin 3, which aired on Canal 9.

References

External links
 

Argentine male television actors
20th-century Argentine male singers
1965 births
Living people
Male actors from Rosario, Santa Fe
Singers from Rosario, Santa Fe